This is a list of films based on English-language comic strips and characters first appearing in them, including single panel gag cartoons appearing in newspapers, magazines, and webcomics. The practice of creating films based on comic strips dates back to the early years of film itself. In recent years, due to advances in special effects, big budget films based on comic books have become more common.

Feature films

A
Based on The Addams Family:
Halloween with the New Addams Family (1977, TV film)
The Addams Family (1991)
Addams Family Values (1993) 
Addams Family Reunion (1998)
 The Addams Family (2019)
 The Addams Family 2 (2021)
Based on Air Hawk and the Flying Doctors (Australia):
Airhawk (1981, TV film)
Based on Accident Man (comic strip).
 Accident Man (2018, direct-to-video)
 Accident Man: Hitman's Holiday (2022, direct-to-video)

B
Based on Barney Google and Snuffy Smith:
Private Snuffy Smith (1942)
Hillbilly Blitzkrieg (1942)
Based on Blondie:
Blondie (1938)
Blondie Meets the Boss (1939)
Blondie Takes a Vacation (1939)
Blondie Brings Up Baby (1939)
Blondie on a Budget (1940)
Blondie Has Servant Trouble (1940)
Blondie Plays Cupid (1940)
Blondie Goes Latin (1941)
Blondie in Society (1941)
Blondie Goes to College (1942)
Blondie's Blessed Event (1942)
Blondie for Victory (1942)
It's a Great Life (1943)
Footlight Glamour (1943)
Leave It to Blondie (1945)
Life with Blondie (1945)
Blondie's Lucky Day (1946)
Blondie Knows Best (1946)
Blondie's Big Moment (1947)
Blondie's Holiday (1947)
Blondie in the Dough (1947)
Blondie's Anniversary (1947)
Blondie's Reward (1948)
Blondie's Secret (1948)
Blondie's Big Deal (1949)
Blondie Hits the Jackpot (1949)
Blondie's Hero (1950)
Beware of Blondie (1950)

Based on Brenda Starr, Reporter:
Brenda Starr (1976, TV film)
Brenda Starr (1989)
Based on Bringing Up Father:
Bringing Up Father (1928)
Vihtori ja Klaara (1939, Finland)
Bringing Up Father (1946)
Jiggs and Maggie in Society (1948)
Jiggs and Maggie in Court (1948)
Jiggs and Maggie in Jackpot Jitters (1949)
Jiggs and Maggie Out West (1950)

C
Based on Colonel Blimp (UK):
The Life and Death of Colonel Blimp (1943)

D
Based on Dennis the Menace:
Dennis the Menace: Dinosaur Hunter (1987, TV film)
Dennis the Menace (1993)
Dennis the Menace Strikes Again (1998, direct-to-video) 
Dennis the Menace: Cruise Control (2002, TV film)
A Dennis the Menace Christmas (2007, direct-to-video)
Based on Dick Tracy:
Dick Tracy (AKA Dick Tracy, Detective) (1945)
Dick Tracy vs. Cueball (1946)
Dick Tracy's Dilemma (1947)
Dick Tracy Meets Gruesome (1947) 
Dick Tracy (1990)
Based on Dondi:
Dondi (1961)

E
Based on Ella Cinders:
Ella Cinders (1926)

F
Based on Fatty Finn (Australia):
The Kid Stakes (1927)
Fatty Finn (1980)
Based on Feiffer (in The Village Voice):
Bernard and Huey (2017)
Based on Flash Gordon:
Flash Gordon (1936) 
Flash Gordon (1980)
Flash Gordon: The Greatest Adventure of All (1982, TV film)
Based on Friday Foster:
Friday Foster (1975)

G
Based on Garfield:
Garfield: The Movie (2004)
Garfield: A Tail of Two Kitties (2006)
Garfield Gets Real (2007, direct-to-video) 
Garfield's Fun Fest (2008, direct-to-video) 
Garfield's Pet Force (2009, direct-to-video)
Based on Gasoline Alley:
Gasoline Alley (1951)
Corky of Gasoline Alley (1951)
Based on Gemma Bovery (UK):
Gemma Bovery (2014)

H
Based on Harold Teen:
Harold Teen (1928)
Harold Teen (1934)
Based on Heathcliff:
Heathcliff: The Movie (1986)

J
Based on Jane (UK):
 The Adventures of Jane (1949)
 Jane and the Lost City (1987)
Based on Jane Arden:
 The Adventures of Jane Arden (1939)
Based on Joe Palooka:
Palooka (1934)
Joe Palooka, Champ (1946)
Gentleman Joe Palooka (1946) 
Joe Palooka in the Knockout (1947) 
Joe Palooka in Fighting Mad (1948) 
Joe Palooka in Winner Take All (1948) 
Joe Palooka in the Big Fight (1949) 
Joe Palooka in the Counterpunch (1949) 
Joe Palooka Meets Humphrey (1950) 
Joe Palooka in Humphrey Takes a Chance (1950) 
Joe Palooka in the Squared Circle (1950) 
Joe Palooka in Triple Cross (1951)
Based on Jungle Jim:
Jungle Jim (1948)
The Lost Tribe (1949)
Mark of the Gorilla (1950)
Captive Girl (1950)
Pygmy Island (1950)
Fury of the Congo (1951)
Jungle Manhunt (1951)
Jungle Jim in the Forbidden Land (1952)
Voodoo Tiger (1952)
Savage Mutiny (1953)
Valley of the Head Hunters (1953)
Killer Ape (1953)
Jungle Man-Eaters (1954)
Cannibal Attack (1954)
Jungle Moon Men (1955)
Devil Goddess (1956)

K
Based on King of the Royal Mounted:
King of the Royal Mounted, 20th Century Fox, September 11, 1936, starred Robert Kent. The feature was retitled Romance of the Royal Mounted when it was released on video.
King of the Royal Mounted, Republic, September 20, 1940, 12-part serial, starred Allan "Rocky" Lane
The Yukon Patrol, Republic, April 30, 1942, feature film version of the 1940 serial King of the Royal Mounted
King of the Mounties, Republic Oct. 17, 1942, 12-part serial, also starring Allan "Rocky" Lane

L
Based on Li'l Abner:
 Li'l Abner (1940)
 Li'l Abner (1959)
 Li'l Abner (1971, TV film)
Based on Little Iodine:
Little Iodine (1946), possibly a lost film
Based on Little Nemo:
Little Nemo: Adventures in Slumberland (1989 Japan/1992 United States)
Slumberland (2022)
Based on Little Orphan Annie:
 Little Orphan Annie (1932)
 Little Orphan Annie (1938)
 Annie (1982)
 Annie: A Royal Adventure! (1995, TV film)
 Annie (1999, TV film)
 Annie (2014)

M
Based on Mandrake the Magician:
 Mandrake Killing'e karsi (1967, unauthorized Turkish film)
 Mandrake (1979, TV film)
Based on Marmaduke:
Marmaduke (2010)
Marmaduke (2022)
Based on Modesty Blaise (UK):
 Modesty Blaise (1966)
 Modesty Blaise (1982, TV pilot)
 My Name Is Modesty (2003)
Based on The Mostly Unfabulous Social Life of Ethan Green:
The Mostly Unfabulous Social Life of Ethan Green (2005)
Based on Motu Patlu (India)
Motu Patlu in Wonderland! (2012, TV film)
Motu Patlu: In Alien World! (2016, TV film)
Motu Patlu: King of Kings (2016)

N
Based on Nono-chan (Japan):
My Neighbors the Yamadas (1999)

O
Based on Over the Hedge:
 Over the Hedge (2006)

P
Based on Peanuts:
A Boy Named Charlie Brown (1969) 
Snoopy, Come Home (1972)
Race for Your Life, Charlie Brown (1977)
Bon Voyage, Charlie Brown (And Don't Come Back!!) (1980)
The Peanuts Movie (2015)
Based on The Phantom:
The Phantom (1961, TV film)
The Phantom (1996)
The Phantom (2009, TV miniseries)
Based on Pogo:
Pogo for President: 'I Go Pogo''' (1980)
Based on Popeye:Popeye (1980)Popeye's Voyage: The Quest for Pappy (2004, animated)
Based on Prince Valiant:Prince Valiant (1954)Prince Valiant (1997)

R
Based on Red Ryder:Tucson Raiders (1944)Marshal of Reno (1944)The San Antonio Kid (1944)Cheyenne Wildcat (1944)Vigilantes of Dodge City (1944)Sheriff of Las Vegas (1944)Great Stagecoach Robbery (1945)Lone Texas Ranger (1945)Phantom of the Plains (1945)Marshal of Laredo (1945)Colorado Pioneers (1945)Wagon Wheels Westward (1945)California Gold Rush (1946)Sheriff of Redwood Valley (1946)Sun Valley Cyclone (1946)Conquest of Cheyenne (1946)Santa Fe Uprising (1946)Stagecoach to Denver (1946)Vigilantes of Boomtown (1947)Homesteaders of Paradise Valley (1947)Oregon Trail Scouts (1947)Rustlers of Devil's Canyon (1947)Marshal of Cripple Creek (1947)Ride, Ryder, Ride (1949)Roll, Thunder, Roll (1949)The Fighting Redhead (1950)The Cowboy and the Prizefighter (1950)
Based on Reg'lar Fellers:Reg'lar Fellers (1941)

S
Based on Sad Sack:The Sad Sack (1957)
Based on Skippy:Skippy (1931)Sooky (1931)
Based on St Trinian's School (UK):The Belles of St Trinian's (1954)Blue Murder at St Trinian's (1957)The Pure Hell of St Trinian's (1960)The Great St Trinian's Train Robbery (1966)The Wildcats of St Trinian's (1980)St Trinian's (2007)St Trinian's 2: The Legend of Fritton's Gold (2009)

T
Based on Tailspin Tommy:Mystery Plane (1939)Sky Patrol (1939)Danger Flight (1939)
Based on Tamara Drewe (UK):Tamara Drewe (2010)
Based on Thimble TheatrePopeye (1980)
Based on Tiffany Jones (UK):Tiffany Jones (1973)
Based on Tillie the Toiler:Tillie the Toiler (1927)Tillie the Toiler (1941)

W
Based on Willie and Joe (Bill Mauldin):Up Front (1951)Back at the Front (1952)

Theatrical short films

Based on Abie the Agent:Animated short: Iska Worreh (1917)Animated Short: Abie Kabibble Outwitted His Rival (1917)
Based on Ally Sloper (UK):
live-action shorts Ally Sloper (1898)
live-action short Sloper's Visit to Brighton (1898)
live-action short Ally Sloper as a Conjuror (1903)
live-action short Ally Sloper on Holiday (1903)
live-action short Ally Sloper at the Races (1903)
series of six live-action shorts (1921)
Based on Barney Google and Snuffy Smith:
series of 12 live-action shorts (1928–1929), starting with Horsefeathers (1928)
series of four animated shorts (1935–1936), starting with Tetched in the Head (1935)
Based on Buster Brown:
series of five shorts (1914), starting with Buster Brown on the Care and Treatment of Goats (1914)
series of 50 live-action shorts (1925–1929), starting with Educating Buster (1925)
Based on Canyon Kiddies:Animated short Mighty Hunters (1940)
Based on Desperate Desmond: 
series of seven live-action shorts (1911–1912), starting with Desperate Desmond Almost Succeeds (1911)
Based on Hairbreadth Harry:
Live-action short Fearless Harry (1926)
Live-action short Danger Ahead (1926)
Live-action short Sawdust Baby (1926)
Live-action short Sign Them Papers (1927)
Live-action short Curses (1927)
Live-action short Foiled (1927)
Live-action short Dirty Work (1927)
Live-action short The Villain (1927)
Live-action short Nutty but Nice (1927)
Live-action short Moonshine and Noses (1927)
Based on Henry:
Animated short Betty Boop with Henry, the Funniest Living American (1935)
Based on Hogan's Alley:
live-action short Trouble in Hogan's Alley (1900)
Based on Joe Palooka:
series of nine two-reel live-action shorts (1936–37), starting with For the Love of Pete (1936)
Based on The Katzenjammer Kids:
Live-action short The Katzenjammer Kids in School (1898)
Live-action short The Katzenjammer Kids Have a Love Affair (1900)
series of eight live-action shorts (1912), starting with The Katzenjammer Kids (1912)
series of 37 animated shorts (1916–1918), starting with The Chinese Cook (1916)
series of five animated shorts (1920), starting with Knock on the Window, the Door Is a Jamb (1920)The Captain and the Kids (1938–1939) series of 15 animated shorts
Based on Krazy Kat:
multiple series of animated shorts (both sound and silent films)
Based on Lady Bountiful (by Gene Carr):
Live-action short Lady Bountiful Visits the Murphys on Wash Day (1903)
Based on Let George Do It:
series of 40 live-action shorts (1924–1929), starting with Why George! (1924)
Based on Li'l Abner:
series of five animated shorts (1944), starting with Amoozin' But Confoozin' (1944)
Based on Little Jimmyanimated short Betty Boop and Little Jimmy (1936)
Based on The Little King:
series of 12 animated shorts (1933–1934), starting with AM to PM (1933)
animated short Betty Boop and the Little King (1936)
Based on Little Nemo:
animated short Winsor McCay, the Famous Cartoonist of the N.Y. Herald and his Moving Comics aka Little Nemo (1911, included in the National Film Registry)
Based on Mike and Ike (They Look Alike):
series of 24 live-action shorts (1927–1929), starting with Dancing Fools (1927)
Based on Mischievous Willie:
Live-action short Mischievous Willie's Rocking Chair Motor (1902)
Based on Mr. Jack:
Live-action short Mr. Jack in the Dressing Room (1904)
Based on Mutt and Jeff:
List of Mutt and Jeff live-action shorts
List of Mutt and Jeff theatrical cartoons
Based on Nancy:
Animated shorts School Daze (1942)
Animated shorts Doing Their Bit (1942)
Based on The Newlyweds/Snookums:
series of 37 live-action shorts (1926–1929), starting with The Newlyweds' Neighbors (1926)
Based on The Outbursts of Everett True:
series of live-action shorts starting with Everett True Breaks Into The Movies (1916)
Based on Popeye:Popeye the Sailor (1933–1957, animated)
two-reel Technicolor shorts:Popeye the Sailor Meets Sindbad the Sailor (1936, included in the National Film Registry)Popeye the Sailor Meets Ali Baba's Forty Thieves (1937)Aladdin and His Wonderful Lamp (1939)
Based on Reg'lar Fellers:
Animated short Happy Days (1936) produced by Ub Iwerks
Based on Sad Sack:The Sad Sack (1950) educational film by upa.
Based on Smitty:
series of 10 live-action shorts (1928–1929), starting with No Picnic (1928)Toonerville FolksBased on Toots and Casper:
series of 12 live-action shorts (1928–1929), starting with Fooling Casper (1928)
What a Wife (1928)  
The Family Meal Ticket (1928) 
Casper's Week End (1928)  
Smile, Buttercup, Smile (1929)  
Big-Hearted Toots (1929)  
Casper's Night Out (1929)  
Toots' Big Idea (1929)  
Spareribs Reforms (1929)  
His Wife's Secret (1929) 
Who's the Boss? (1929)  
Don't Say Ain't (1929) 
Based on Uncle Mun: Uncle Mun and the Minister (1912)A Thrilling Rescue by Uncle Mun (1912)
Based on Willie WestinghouseA Shocking Incident (I) (1903) (Short) aka "Willie Westinghouse and the Doctor's Battery"
Based on Winnie Winkle:
Series of ten live action shorts (1926–1928), starting with Working Winnie (1926)

Television specials

Based on B.C.:B.C.: The First Thanksgiving (1973)B.C.: A Special Christmas (1981)
Based on Blondie:Blondie & Dagwood (1987)Blondie & Dagwood: Second Wedding Workout (1989)
Based on Cathy:Cathy (1987)Cathy's Last Resort (1988) Cathy's Valentine (1989)
Based on Dennis the Menace:Dennis the Menace in Mayday for Mother (1981)
Based on Doonesbury:A Doonesbury Special (1977)
Based on The Family Circus:A Special Valentine with the Family Circus (1978)A Family Circus Christmas (1979)A Family Circus Easter (1982)
Based on The Far Side:Gary Larson's Tales from the Far Side (1994)Tales from the Far Side II (1997)
Based on For Better or For Worse:For Better or for Worse: The Bestest Present (1985) For Better or for Worse: The Last Camping Trip (1992)For Better or for Worse: A Christmas Angel (1992) For Better or for Worse: A Valentine from the Heart (1993)For Better or for Worse: The Good-for-Nothing (1993)For Better or for Worse: The Babe Magnet (1994)For Better or for Worse: A Storm in April (1995)
Based on Garfield:Here Comes Garfield (1982)Garfield on the Town (1983)Garfield in the Rough (1984)Garfield's Halloween Adventure (1985)Garfield in Paradise (1986)Garfield Goes Hollywood (1987)A Garfield Christmas (1987)Happy Birthday, Garfield (1988)Garfield: His 9 Lives (1988)Garfield's Babes and Bullets (1989)Garfield's Thanksgiving (1989)Garfield's Feline Fantasies (1990)Garfield Gets a Life (1991)
Based on Hägar the Horrible:Hägar the Horrible (1989)
Based on Little Orphan Annie:
 Little Orphan Annie's A Very Animated Christmas (1995)
Based on Marvin:Marvin, Baby of the Year (1989)
Based on Peanuts:
see List of Peanuts media: TV specials
Based on Pogo:The Pogo Special Birthday Special (1969)
Based on A Wish for Wings That Work: (characters originated in Bloom County)A Wish for Wings That Work (1991)
Based on Ziggy:Ziggy's Gift (1982)

Serial films
Based on Ace Drummond:Ace Drummond (1936)
Based on The Adventures of Smilin' Jack:The Adventures of Smilin' Jack (1943)
Based on Brenda Starr, Reporter:Brenda Starr, Reporter (1945)
Based on Brick Bradford:Brick Bradford (1947)
Based on Bruce Gentry:Bruce Gentry (1949)
Based on Dick Tracy:Dick Tracy (1937) Dick Tracy Returns (1938)  Dick Tracy's G-Men (1939)Dick Tracy vs Crime Inc (1939)
Based on Don Winslow of the Navy:Don Winslow of the Navy (1942)Don Winslow of the Coast Guard (1943)
Based on Flash Gordon:Flash Gordon (1936)Flash Gordon's Trip to Mars (1938)Flash Gordon Conquers the Universe (1940)
Based on Jungle Jim:Jungle Jim (1937)
Based on King of the Royal Mounted:King of the Royal Mounted (1940)King of the Mounties (1942)
Based on Mandrake the Magician:Mandrake the Magician (1939)
Based on The Phantom:The Phantom (1943)The Adventures of Captain Africa (1955) (rights to character expired during production)
Based on Radio Patrol:Radio Patrol (1937)
Based on Red Barry:Red Barry (1938)
Based on Red Ryder:Adventures of Red Ryder (1940)
Based on Secret Agent X-9:Secret Agent X-9 (1937)Secret Agent X-9 (1945)
Based on Tailspin Tommy:Tailspin Tommy (1934)Tailspin Tommy in the Great Air Mystery (1935)
Based on Terry and the Pirates:Terry and the Pirates (1940)
Based on Tim Tyler's Luck:Tim Tyler's Luck (1937)

 Other 

 Caveman: V.T. Hamlin & Alley Oop  (2005, comic strip documentary)Dark Dungeons (2014, short film, Chick tract)
 The Fantastic Funnies (1980, comic strip documentary)
 God Hates Cartoons'' (2002, DVD compilation of animated shorts)

See also
Comic strip
Lists of film source material
List of films based on comics
List of films based on radio series
List of films based on television programs
List of television series based on comic strips

References

External links
Comics2Film
Superheroes Lives

Comic strips
 
Comic strips